Daniel Richter (born 1962) is a German artist. He is based in Berlin, and was previously  active in Hamburg. He is known for large-scale oil paintings.

Life and work 
Daniel Richter was born in 1962 in Eutin, Germany. Richter attended Hochschule für bildende Künste Hamburg from 1991 to 1995. Between 1992 and 1996 he studied with Werner Büttner, one of the protagonists, along with Martin Kippenberger, of the revival of expressive trends in painting during the 1980s, and worked as assistant to Albert Oehlen.

Between 2004 and 2006 he served as Professor for Painting at the Universität der Künste, Berlin. Since 2006, he has been Professor of Fine Arts at Akademie der bildenden Künste, Vienna.
 
Richter's early work was abstract and colorful, described as, "psychedelic – somewhere between graffiti and intricate ornamentation". Since 2002, he has painted large-scale scenes filled with figures, often inspired by reproductions from newspapers or history books.

He was previously married to theatre director Angela Richter, together they have a son. In 2019, he founded the publishing Company PAMPAM Publishing with his current wife, Viennese photographer Hanna Putz.

Stage design
Working for the Salzburg Festival, Richter created the stage design for two stages: for Bluebeard's Castle (2008) and for Lulu (2010). In 2010, Richter designed a series of stage sets for the Salzburg Opera's production of Lulu in conjunction with his solo museum exhibition at the Rupertinum Museum of Modern Art, Salzburg, Austria.

Awards 
 1998 Otto-Dix-Award, Gera
 2001 Award for Young Art, Schleswig-Holstein, Germany
 2002 Preis der Nationalgalerie, Hamburger Bahnhof, Berlin, Germany
 2009 Kunstpreis Finkenwerder, Hamburg, Germany

References

External links
  El control del azar en Daniel Richter, por Enrique Castaños
 Tal R on Daniel Richter - Daniel Richter on Tal R – Video interview by Louisiana Channel
 Daniel Richter talks about Emil Nolde Video by Louisiana Channel

1962 births
Living people
People from Plön (district)
20th-century German painters
20th-century German male artists
German male painters
21st-century German painters
21st-century German male artists
German contemporary artists
University of Fine Arts of Hamburg alumni